Francisco Cassiani Gómez (born April 22, 1968 in Arboletes, Antioquia), known as Francisco Cassiani, is a Colombian former footballer who played as a centre-back for clubs in Colombia, Argentina, Peru and Chile.

He is the older brother of Geovanis Cassiani.

Teams
 Atlético Nacional 1986–1992
 América de Cali 1993
 Atlético Junior 1993–1997
 Rosario Central 1998
 Deportes Quindío 1999
 Atlético Junior 1999
 Santiago Wanderers 2000–2001
 Alianza Atlético 2002–2003

Honours
Atlético Nacional
 Copa Libertadores: 1989

Santiago Wanderers
 Chilean Primera División: 2001

Notes

References

External links
 Francisco Cassiani at playmakerstats.com (English version of ceroacero.es)
 

Living people
1968 births
Sportspeople from Antioquia Department
Colombian footballers
Association football central defenders
Colombia international footballers
1995 Copa América players
Categoría Primera A players
Argentine Primera División players
Chilean Primera División players
Atlético Nacional footballers
América de Cali footballers
Atlético Junior footballers
Rosario Central footballers
Deportes Quindío footballers
Santiago Wanderers footballers
Alianza Atlético footballers
Colombian expatriate footballers
Colombian expatriate sportspeople in Argentina
Expatriate footballers in Argentina
Colombian expatriate sportspeople in Chile
Expatriate footballers in Chile
Colombian expatriate sportspeople in Peru
Expatriate footballers in Peru